Shuitou is a town in and the county seat of Jiaokou County, southwestern Shanxi province, North China. It was formerly named 
Chéngguān (城关 / 城關) until 2001, when the county reorganised its administrative divisions.

References

Township-level divisions of Shanxi